Cleonymia yvanii is a moth of the family Noctuidae first described by Philogène Auguste Joseph Duponchel in 1833. It is found in Portugal, north-eastern Spain, southern France and north-eastern Italy.

The wingspan is 18–25 mm.

Description
Adults are variable in colour, ranging from ochre to greyish brown. Warren (1914) states 
C. yvanii Dup. (24 f). Much like vaulogeri Stgr.,[Cleonymia vaulogeri (Staudinger, 1899)] the inner and outer lines similarly incurved and connected on submedian fold; orbicular and reniform stigmata very small, with fuscous centres and greyish annuli, separated by a diffuse brown median shade; submarginal line grey, obscure, whitish and oblique at costa; fringe brown in basal half, chequered in outer; hindwing fuscous, the base paler;—korbi Stgr.[ now species Cleonymia korbi] is paler, without the black streak in base of cell of forewing. S. France and Spain. Larva yellowish white, the lateral lines red, the dorsal line dark, interrupted; feeding on seeds of Helianthemum.

Biology
Adults are on wing from the end of April to mid-July in one generation per year.

The larvae feed on Helianthemum species. They can be found in late summer. The species overwinters in the pupal stage.

References

External links 

"Cleonymia yvanii Dup. La Cléophane concave". Lépi'Net. 

"09284 Cleonymia yvanii (Duponchel, 1833)". Lepiforum e. V. Retrieved February 7, 2021. 

Moths described in 1833
Cuculliinae
Moths of Europe
Taxa named by Philogène Auguste Joseph Duponchel